Trooz Glacier is an Antarctic glacier. Situated on the Kyiv Peninsula in Graham Land, 1.5 nautical miles (2.8 km) wide at its mouth and some 15 nautical miles (28 km) long, it flows west into the north part of Collins Bay. It was Discovered by the French Antarctic Expedition, 1908–10 and Named for J. de Trooz, Belgian Minister of the Interior and Public Instruction, who was instrumental in procuring funds for the publication of the scientific results of the Belgian Antarctic Expedition, 1897–99. This application was suggested by the Advisory Committee on Antarctic Names (US-ACAN) because of duplication of the name Trooz for what is now known as Cape Perez.

References
 SCAR Composite Gazetteer of Antarctica.

Glaciers of Graham Coast